Bernard Babington Smith, OBE (1905-1993) was a British academic, wartime intelligence officer and amateur athlete.

Early life and education
He was born on 26 October 1905 at 29 Hyde Park Gate, London, the son of Sir Henry Babington Smith and Lady Elizabeth Bruce, daughter of Victor Bruce, 9th Earl of Elgin, 13th Earl of Kincardine and former Viceory of India. He was educated at Eton College, where he was Captain of School and King's College, Cambridge. He was one of 10 children and his siblings included the banker Michael Babington Smith and Constance Babington Smith, a biographer and wartime intelligence officer. Another sister, Lucy, married Henry Sinclair, 2nd Baron Pentland.

Athletics

He competed in the pole vault at the 1930 British Empire Games for England. He also fenced for both England and Scotland.

Wartime Intelligence Service
Bernard joined the RAF Volunteer Reserve in October 1940. Among his first duties and basic training was detachment to Coventry to assist with the clearing up process after the German air raid in November 1940. He was initially posted to 3 Photo Reconnaissance Unit (PRU) at RAF Oakington as the deputy intelligence officer, arriving on 1 December 1940. The unit, commanded by his close friend Squadron Leader Pat Ogilvie, supported RAF Bomber Command. He quickly became involved in the interpretation of the night photographs taken by bombers during the raid, learning how to identify and locate anti-aircraft defences from searchlights and gun flashes as well as the course of the raid from bomb explosions. It became clear to him that the accuracy of the bombing was appalling  and he had the unpleasant duty briefing this fact to Sir Arthur 'Bomber' Harris. His researches led to the establishment of Professor Frederick Lindemann's enquiry (also known as the Butt Report) into bombing accuracy. In mid-1941 he was posted to the Central Interpretation Unit (CIU) at RAF Medmenham, where his sister Constance Babington Smith was also stationed, and tasked with setting up a Night Photographic Section.  As the size of the bombing raids grew the volume of imagery grew exponentially. Bernard, a trained statistician developed a system for the selection of photography to be interpreted after each raid which enabled his section to cope.  Unlike most sections in Medmenham the interpreters in the night section did not use stereo images, but its expertise became widely recognised and appreciated. Members of the section frequently visited Bomber Command Headquarters to brief Sir Arthur 'Bomber' Harris. Bernard was mentioned in despatches four times and awarded an OBE.

Academic career
He was a fellow of Pembroke College, Oxford and Senior Lecturer in Experimental Psychology at the University of Oxford.

In 1938 and 1939 he worked with Maurice Kendall on the question of random number generation. They developed both one of the first early mechanical devices to produce random digits, and formulated a series of tests for statistical randomness in a given set of digits which, with some small modifications, became fairly widely used. They also produced one of the second large collections of random digits (100,000 in total, over twice as many as those published by L. H. C. Tippett in 1927), which was a commonly used tract until the publication of RAND Corporation's A Million Random Digits with 100,000 Normal Deviates in 1955.

In later career he became interested in training managers and collaborated with Ralph Coverdale, a co-operation which developed in time to become the Coverdale Organisation, a management training business.  Babington Smith's ideas on training were later condensed into the book Manager and Team Development.

Personal life
He married Helen Elizabeth Crocket, PhD. on the 5 October 1940. They had two sons and a daughter. In 1952 he and his wife purchased and restored Yelford Manor in Oxfordshire. He died in Oxford on the 24 August 1993.

Ancestry

References

1905 births
1993 deaths
Athletes (track and field) at the 1930 British Empire Games
Commonwealth Games competitors for England
English male pole vaulters